The 33rd National Hockey League All-Star Game was held in The Forum in Inglewood, home to the Los Angeles Kings, on February 10, 1981.

Game summary

MVP: Mike Liut, St. Louis Blues

Notes
Bryan Trottier named to Campbell team, but did not play.

See also
1980–81 NHL season

References
 

All
National Hockey League All-Star Games
Sports competitions in Inglewood, California
Ice hockey competitions in California
National Hockey League All-Star Game
National Hockey League All-Star Game